The Main Guard is a National Monument and former courthouse located in Clonmel, Ireland.

Location
The Main Guard is located in the centre of Clonmel, north of the River Suir.

History

It was here that the "main guard" of the troops for Clonmel were once stationed. During the Siege of Clonmel (1650), the old Manor Court was destroyed, and after the restoration of His Grace The 1st Duke of Ormonde's (1610–88) palatinate rights in 1662, he ordered the building of a new courthouse. Some of the stone was taken from Inishlounaght Abbey (closed in 1540). It was completed in 1674: a courthouse for the Palatinate of County Tipperary. Also in the courthouse were private apartments, a dining room and drawing room. These were used to entertain King James II in Clonmel in 1689. The building was also used as a "tholsel", for gathering tolls. Some of the design was copied from works of Sir Christopher Wren.

In 1715, the Palatinate jurisdiction was extinguished. After that, the Clonmel Assizes was held in the building, and it was there that Father Nicholas Sheehy, the anti-Penal Laws agitator, was tried in 1766. He was hanged, drawn and quartered.

In about 1810, the ground floor, a loggia of open arches, was converted into shops, a basement excavated and additional floors inserted. In the 1990s the Office of Public Works began to restore its original form and the open arcade of sandstone columns is once again a feature of the streetscape.

Description

The Main Guard is a formerly detached five-bay two-storey courthouse and market house, with arcaded ground floor. It incorporates classical elements, such as the pediment. PUNCH commenced restoration works in 2004.

References

Tourist attractions in County Tipperary
National Monuments in County Tipperary
Museums in County Tipperary
Buildings and structures in Clonmel
1674 establishments in Ireland